"Pianist" is the twenty-fourth episode of the first season of the South Korean anthology series KBS Drama Special. Starring Choi Min-ho and Han Ji-hye, it aired on KBS2 on November 27, 2010.

Plot
21-year-old Oh Je-ro is a musical genius, but in order to support his sick father, he's worked for years at a piano factory as a tuner. He despairs of ever being given a chance to learn how to play the piano, and thinks the name his father gave him sounds like "Oh, Zero," signifying his lack of hope in the future. This changes when he meets and falls in love with Yoon In-sa, a 30-year-old music teacher in a school. In-sa dreamed of becoming the world's greatest pianist when she was young, but she was also forced to give up her dreams because of her poor circumstances. Instead, she leads an exhausting life as a part-time music teacher at an elementary school. A piano will bring these two souls together, as they share their dreams, hopes, pain and eventually heal each other.

Cast
Choi Min-ho as Oh Je-ro 
Han Ji-hye as Yoon In-sa
Choi Phillip as Han Jung-woo
Jo Hee-bong

Rating

References

External links
 Pianist official KBS website 
 

2010 South Korean television episodes
South Korean romance television series
South Korean melodrama television series